The following is a list of champions, along with runner-ups and semifinalists, within the Evolution Championship Series.  For table compactness, only the top 4 are included.  Additional details are available in the individual event articles by year.

BlazBlue series

Dead or Alive series

Dragonball FighterZ series

Guilty Gear series

Injustice series

Killer Instinct series

The King of Fighters series

Marvel vs. Capcom series

Melty Blood series

Mortal Kombat series

Persona series

Capcom vs. SNK series

Soulcalibur series

Street Fighter series

Street Fighter X Tekken series

Super Smash Bros. series

Tekken series

Virtua Fighter series

Other games

Players with multiple championships

References

External links

Evolution Championship Series